Olukayode "Kayode" Abraham Ajulo is a Nigerian lawyer, arbitrator, and civil rights activist. He is a Fellow of the Chartered Institute of Arbitrators. and the Diocesan Registrar of the Anglican Communion, Church of Nigeria.

Early life and education 
Ajulo was born to Christiana Monisola O. Ajulo. He earned a bachelor's degree in Law from the University of Jos in 1999. In 2001, after graduating from the Nigerian Law school in 2000, he was called to the Nigerian Bar. He obtained a Master of Laws degree in 2006 from the University of Jos. 

Ajulo is also an Adjunct Lecturer at Adekunle Ajasin University, Akungba-Akoko, Ondo State and Egalitarian Basic Studies Institute, Kumasi, Ghana. In 2013, he was appointed the chairman of the board of Radiovision Corporation by the Governor of Ondo State.

Ajulo is a research scholar in the School of Law at Middlesex University London.

Career 

Ajulo was a Labour Party candidate for the FCT senate seat held on 9 April 2011.

On 7 April 2011, it was reported that Ajulo had been abducted by armed men. This caused the Abuja workers led by the Nigeria Labour Congress to boycott the election. In a statement by the leadership of the Nigeria Labour Congress (NLC) Abuja council, all workers and affiliates across the territory were directed to boycott the National Assembly election 16 hours before the election across the country over the abduction of Kayode Ajulo.

Before the 2015 Nigeria general elections, Ajulo was National Secretary of the Labour Party from 2014 to 2015. and in 2019 was confirmed as the Mayegun Aare Onakakanfo of Yorubaland by the Iba Gani Adams

In 2020, Ajulo was appointed as member for the Edo State Governorship Primary Election Appeal Committee in 2020. He is the Diocesan Registrar of the Anglican Communion, Church of Nigeria.

Personal life 

Ajulo is married for over 20 years.

References 

21st-century Nigerian lawyers
Nigerian politicians
Nigerian human rights activists
Living people
University of Jos alumni
Nigerian Law School alumni
1974 births
Arbitrators